Patalghar ( "The Underground Chamber" ) is a Bengali science fiction film based on the story of same name by Shirshendu Mukhopadhyay and directed by Abhijit Chaudhuri.

Plot
150 years in the past, Aghor Sen, a genius scientist living in the village of Nischintipur invents a device that generates sound waves which can put any living being to sleep. The alien Vik exiled from the planet Nyapcha, lands with his space shuttle on the outskirts of Nischintipur. He gets to know about the machine & tries to steal it but Aghor puts him to sleep. With Aghor's death the instrument is lost.

150 years later i.e. in the present day Dr. Bhootnath Nondy finds Aghor Sen's diary mentioning this device. Bhootnath deciphers the diary at a science seminar announcing his plea to search for it. Begum, a gang leader, sends her goons after Bhootnath to get that machine. Aghar Sen's device is in his laboratory - Patalghar. To reach there, one must solve the mysterious rhymes mentioned in the diary. Suddenly foreigners wanting to buy houses assail Nischintipur. At this juncture, Begum and Bhootnath work together in search of the machine.

Kartik, a very intelligent & brave boy, lives with his uncle (Mama) Subuddhi. A lawyer reports to them that Kartik is the only legal heir of Aghor Sen's laboratory at Nischintipur. Thus the duo reached there. Begum asks them to sell their house but they bluntly refuse. Bhootnath develops a friendship with Karthik.

Meanwhile, Vik wakes up and starts running from pillar to post looking for the device which had put him to sleep. Subuddhi joins the theatre chief of the village and searches for a unique character who could depict Mahommadi Beg in the play. He meets Vik in the forest and selects him for the character.

Finally Bhootnath & Karthik unravel the path for the entrance of Patalghar and rediscover the machine. The Begum & her goons die in a duel with the alien Vik and finally Vik is once again put to sleep by the joint efforts of Bhootnath & Karthik by using the musical machine. Bhootnath flies of to Nyapcha with the unconscious Vik & Karthik remains on the earth inheriting the glorious legacy of Aghor Sen & Bhootnath Nandi. The great machine ultimately gets destroyed amidst all the chaos and havoc.

Cast
 Sourav Bandopadhay as Kartik
 Biplab Chatterjee as Vik
 Soumitra Chatterjee as Aghor Sen
 Ketaki Dutta as Pishima (Aghor Sen's Aunt)
 Monu Mukherjee as Gobinda Biswas
 Sunil Mukherjee as Lawyer
 Kharaj Mukhopadhyay as Subuddhi
 Joy Sengupta as Dr. Bhootnath Nandy
 Mita Vasisht as Begum
 Ramaprasad Banik
 Ratan Sarkhel as Goon

Crew
 Director Abhijit Chaudhuri
 Cameraman Abhik Mukhopadhyay
 Producer Niti Sonee Gourisaria
 Music Director Debojyoti Mishra
 Lyrics Rangan Chakraborty
 Editor Arjun Gourisaria
 Art Director Indranil Ghosh
 Executive Producer Bauddhayan Mukherji

Awards
 National Film Award
 Indira Gandhi Award for Best Debut Film of a Director- Abhijit Chaudhuri
 Best Cinematography-Abhik Mukhopadhyay

See also
 Science fiction film of India

References

External links

2003 films
2000s Bengali-language films
Indian science fiction films
Indian children's films
Bengali-language Indian films
Films based on Indian novels
2003 science fiction films
Films whose cinematographer won the Best Cinematography National Film Award
Best Debut Feature Film of a Director National Film Award winners
Films based on works by Shirshendu Mukhopadhyay